Apache Lenya is a Java/XML open-source content management system.

The Lenya project was retired to the Apache Attic in April 2015.

See also

List of content management systems

References

External links
Apache Lenya website
Apache Lenya wiki

Free content management systems
Lenya
Free software programmed in Java (programming language)